Rodger Miles Davis (born 18 May 1951) is an Australian professional golfer.

Career
Davis was born in Sydney. He turned professional in 1974 and spent his regular career playing mainly on the PGA Tour of Australasia and the European Tour. He won the PGA Tour of Australasia Order of Merit in 1990 and 1991. He made the top ten of the European Tour Order of Merit four times in the late 1980s and early 1990s. His seven European Tour wins included two of Europe's most prestigious tournaments; the British PGA Championship, which he won in 1986 at Wentworth Club, and the season ending Volvo Masters, which he claimed in 1991. His best finish on the PGA Tour was a tie for fifth at the 1986 NEC World Series of Golf.

Davis was ranked in the top 10 of the Official World Golf Ranking for 29 weeks between 1987 and 1992. In the 1987 Open Championship, Davis shot a first round of 64 at Muirfield to lead the tournament by three strokes after the opening round. He finished the championship in a tie for 2nd place with American Paul Azinger, a stroke behind the champion Nick Faldo. The 1987 Open Championship is Davis's best finish in a major championship.

Davis represented Australia in team competitions several times, and was a member of his country's winning three-man team at the 1986 Alfred Dunhill Cup.

As a senior, he played mainly on the U.S.-based Champions Tour (2001–05), where he won once, the 2003 Toshiba Senior Classic. He played on the European Seniors Tour in 2011 and 2012.

Amateur wins
this list may be incomplete
1973 Lake Macquarie Amateur

Professional wins (30)

European Tour wins (7)

European Tour playoff record (3–2)

PGA Tour of Australasia wins (14)

PGA Tour of Australasia playoff record (3–1)

Other Australasian wins (5)
1977 Rosebud Invitational
1978 South Australia Open, Nedlands Masters, West Australia Open, Mandurah Open

Other wins (1)
1998 Mauritius Open

Champions Tour wins (1)

Other senior wins (2)
2009 Handa Australian Senior Open
2015 Australian PGA Seniors Championship

Results in major championships

CUT = missed the half-way cut
"T" indicates a tie for a place

Summary

Most consecutive cuts made – 5 (1977 Open Championship – 1981 Open Championship)
Longest streak of top-10s – 1 (twice)

Team appearances
World Cup (representing Australia): 1985, 1987, 1991, 1993
Dunhill Cup (representing Australia): 1986 (winners), 1987, 1988, 1990, 1992, 1993
Four Tours World Championship (representing Australasia): 1986, 1987, 1988, 1990 (winners), 1991
UBS Cup (representing the Rest of the World): 2002, 2003 (tie), 2004

References

External links

Australian male golfers
PGA Tour of Australasia golfers
European Tour golfers
PGA Tour Champions golfers
European Senior Tour golfers
Golfers from Sydney
1951 births
Living people